Yellow Girl Bay 32B is a First Nations reserve in Kenora District, Ontario. It is one of the reserves of the Naotkamegwanning First Nation.

References

External links
 Canada Lands Survey System

Saulteaux reserves in Ontario
Communities in Kenora District